This is a list of notable visual artists who are lesbian, gay, bisexual, transgender, queer or otherwise non-heterosexual. This list covers artists known for the creation of visual art such as drawings, paintings, sculptures, photographs, installations, performance works and video works. The entries are in alphabetical order by surname. Birth and death dates are included. All new additions to this list should include a reference.

B
 Jean-Michel Basquiat (1960-1988), USA
 Alison Bechdel (born 1960), USA
Joan E. Biren (born 1944), USA 
 Rora Blue (born ), USA
 Rosa Bonheur (1822–1899), FRA
 Joe Brainard (1942-1994), USA

C
 Cathy Cade (born 1942), USA
 Paul Cadmus (1904-1999), USA
 Tammy Rae Carland (born 1965), USA
Jean Cocteau (1889-1963), France   
 Liz Collins (born), USA
 Frank Coombs (1906-1941), GBR
 Enrico Corte (born 1963), Italy

D
 TM Davy (Born 1980), USA
 Jimmy De Sana (1949-1990), USA
 Raúl de Nieves (born 1983), Mexico 
 Beauford Delaney (1901-1979), USA 
 Angela Dufresne (born 1969), USA 
 Chloe Dzubilo (1960-2011), USA

E
 Thomas Eakins (1844-1916) USA
 Rafa Esparza (born 1981), USA

F
 Lola Flash (born 1959), USA
 Eve Fowler (born 1964), USA
 Louis Fratino (born 1993), USA
 Jared French (1905-1988), USA
 Richard Fung (born 1954), TTO/CAN

G 
 Chitra Ganesh (born 1975), USA 
 Jeffrey Gibson (born 1972), USA
Nash Glynn (born 1992), USA 
Robert Gober (born 1954), USA
 Félix González-Torres (1957-1996)
Nancy Grossman (born 1940), USA
Sonali Gulati (born 1972), IND/USA

H
 Barbara Hammer (1939 - 2019) USA
Harmony Hammond (born 1944), USA
Michelle Handelman (born 1960), USA
Keith Haring (1958 - 1990), USA
Sadao Hasegawa (1945-1999), Japan
 David Hockney (born 1937), Great Britain
 Marie Høeg (1866 - 1949), Norway
 Boscoe Holder (1921-2007), Trinidad and Tobago 
 Every Ocean Hughes (born 1977), USA
 Johanna Hedva (born 1984), USA
 Peter Hujar (1934-1987), USA

J
 Jasper Johns (born 1930), USA
 Jess (1923-2004), USA

K
 Frida Kahlo (1907-1954), Mexico
 Katlego Kai Kolanyane-Kesupile (born 1988), Botswana
 Ben Kimura (1947-2003), Japan
 Kiss and Tell collective, CAN
 Brian Kenny, GER
 Anna Elizabeth Klumpke (1856-1942), USA/FRA
 Eardley Knollys (1902–1991), GBR

L
 Doron Langberg (born 1985) Israel
Thomas Lanigan-Schmidt (born 1948), USA 
 Greer Lankton (1958-1996), USA
 Joe Lycett (born 1988) UK
 George Platt Lynes (1907-1955), USA

M
 Julie Mehretu (born 1970), Ethiopia
 Michelangelo (1475-1564) Italy
 Kate Millett (1934–2017), USA
 Allyson Mitchell, CAN
Kent Monkman (born 1965), Canada 
 Slava Mogutin (born 1974), Russia

O
 Catherine Opie (born 1961), USA

P
 Oren Pinhassi (born 1985), Israel
 Maria E. Piñeres (born 1966), COL
 Jody Pinto (born 1942), USA
 Jill Posener (born 1953), GBR

Q
 Wayne Douglas Quinn (born 1941), USA.
 George Quaintance (1902- 1957), USA

R
 Robert Rauschenberg (1925-2008), USA

S
 Annie Sprinkle (born 1954), USA
 Sal Salandra (born 1946), USA

T
 Gengoroh Tagame (born 1964), Japan
 Tim Tate (born 1960), USA
 Wolfgang Tillmans (born 1968), Germany
 Mickalene Thomas (born 1971), USA
 Tom of Finland (1920-1991), Finland 
 George Tooker (1920-2011), USA
 Salman Toor (born 1983), Pakistan/USA
 Yannis Tsarouchis (1910-1989), Greece

W 
 WangShui (born 1986), USA
 Andy Warhol (1928-1987), USA
 Ambera Wellmann (born 1982), Canada 
 Kehinde Wiley (born 1977), USA
 Jimmy Wright (born 1944), USA
 David Wojnarowicz (1954-1992), USA

V
 Del LaGrace Volcano (born 1957), USA

References

Queer artists
 
Artists
LGBT artists, list of